Thomas John Burgoyne (1775 – 20 October 1847) was an English first-class cricketer who made 24 known appearances from 1796 to 1816. His place of birth is Marylebone; he died in London. He was mainly associated with Middlesex. He played for the Gentlemen in the second Gentlemen v Players match in 1806.

References

1775 births
1847 deaths
English cricketers
English cricketers of 1787 to 1825
Gentlemen cricketers
Middlesex cricketers
The Bs cricketers
Non-international England cricketers
Gentlemen of England cricketers
Marylebone Cricket Club cricketers
London Cricket Club cricketers
St John's Wood cricketers